Sycamore Service Corps is a local program of AmeriCorps in Terre Haute, Indiana. It is sponsored by the Center for Public Service and Community Engagement at Indiana State University. Sycamore Service Corps provide service to local non-profit organizations.

Activities
Sycamore Service Corps members work on community needs in education, public safety, human services, and the environment.  For example, Sycamore Service Corps members might:
Tutor teens and teach elementary school students
Work in food pantry/food drive
Assist families in locating parenting and child care resources
Provide one-on-one mentoring 
Lead youth programs and activities
Teach adults basic life skills
Help unemployed or underemployed adults with job skills
	 
AmeriCorps members are U.S. Citizens, nationals, or lawful permanent residents of the U.S. and at least 18 years of age.

External links
 Sycamore Service Corps Website

Charities based in Indiana
AmeriCorps organizations
Indiana State University